Old Sun Glacier is in Glacier National Park in the U.S. state of Montana. The glacier was named after a sun priest of the Blackfoot called "Ntas", translated to Old Sun. Old Sun Glacier has numerous crevasses and appears to have a healthy accumulation zone. Old Sun Glacier lost 12 percent of its surface area between 1966 and 2005.

See also
 List of glaciers in the United States
 Glaciers in Glacier National Park (U.S.)

References

Glaciers of Glacier County, Montana
Glaciers of Glacier National Park (U.S.)
Glaciers of Montana